The 1928 United States Senate election in Minnesota took place on November 6, 1928. Incumbent Farmer–Labor U.S. Senator Henrik Shipstead defeated his Republican challenger, former St. Paul mayor Arthur E. Nelson, to win a second term.

Farmer–Labor primary

Candidates

Declared
 Henrik Shipstead, Incumbent U.S. Senator since 1923
 William Watkins, Switchman and resident of Minneapolis

Results

Republican primary

Candidates

Declared
 J. A. A. Burnquist, 19th Governor of Minnesota (1915-1921), former state Representative from the 33rd HD (1909-1913), former Lieutenant Governor (1913-1915), candidate for U.S. Senate in 1923, resident of St. Paul 
 Arthur E. Nelson, 35th Mayor of St. Paul (1922-1926), attorney
 A. J. Rockne, State Senator since 1911, and 29th Speaker of the Minnesota House of Representatives (1909-1911), former state Representative from the 29th HD (1903-1911), attorney from Zumbrota

Results

General election

Results

See also 
 United States Senate elections, 1928

References

Minnesota
1928
1928 Minnesota elections